The Iron Stair may refer to:

 The Iron Stair (novel), a crime novel by Rita
 The Iron Stair (1920 film), a British film adaptation directed by F. Martin Thornton
 The Iron Stair (1933 film), a British film adaptation directed by Leslie S. Hiscott